The Do-Ashkaft Cave, being a Middle Paleolithic cave site, is located north of Kermanshah, near Taq-e Bostan, Iran about  above sea level. Its entrance faces south of Meywala Mount, overlooking the national park of Kuhestan. The site was first visited in 1996 by Iranian researchers F. Biglari and S. Heydari-Guran and during the following four years a series of surface surveys were made at one-month intervals, which resulted in a rich collection of Middle Paleolithic lithic artifacts.

Large areas of Breccia sediments indicate lateral percolation of water into the cave sediments as a substantial amount of the cave sediments may have been washed away. The sediments at the entrance yielded numerous animal bones, charcoal and flint tools, Middle Paleolithic artifacts, such as side-scrapers and a Mousterian point. Animal bones show signs of human involvement in their accumulation during the Mousterian occupation. They include a fragment of a right mandible of an adult specimen and an upper third right molar of a sub-adult ruminant, both allocated to wild Caprinae.

In 1999 an area of about  including 14 caves and rock-shelters was surveyed, where Upper Palaeolithic and later lithic assemblages came to light. Records and samples made by S. Heydari provide a paleo-environmental sequence for the region from the late Middle Pleistocene to the Holocene. The Neanderthal occupants of the cave made tools from local raw material outcrops around the cave, which classify as to be Mousterian.

References

Bibliography

 Fereidoun Biglari and Saman Heydari (2001) Do-Ashkaft: a recently discovered Mousterian cave site in the Kermanshah Plain, Iran, Antiquity, Vol 75, No: 289, Page: 487–488
 Biglari, F.(2007) Approvisionnement et utilisation des matières premières au Paléolithique moyen dans la plaine de Kermanshah Iran) : le cas de la Grotte Do-Ashkaft, M. H. Moncel, A. Moigne, M. Arzarello, C. Peretto (eds), Aires 'approvisionnement en matières premières et aires d'approvisionnement en resources alimentaires Approche intégrée des comportements, Workshop 23, XV Congrès UISPP, Lisbonne, Vol. 5, BAR International Series 172

External links

 Kermanshah Cultural Heritage Organization web site
 Do-Ashkaft Cave
 Lithic raw material use in Do-Ashkaft
 Discover Neanderthal footprints at Iran’s Do-Ashkaft Cave

Gallery

1996 archaeological discoveries
Caves of Iran
Landforms of Kermanshah Province
Archaeological sites in Iran
Neanderthal sites
Mousterian
Prehistoric Iran